Rafael Storm (1889–1951) was an American film actor.

Selected filmography
 It Happened in New York (1935)
 The Plot Thickens (1935)
 Under the Pampas Moon (1935)
 The Fighting Pilot (1935)
 Lady Tubbs (1935)
The House of a Thousand Candles (1936)
 When Ladies Meet (1941)
 Repent at Leisure (1941)
 Two Latins from Manhattan (1941)
 Submarine Base (1943)

References

Bibliography
 Blottner, Gene. Columbia Pictures Movie Series, 1926-1955: The Harry Cohn Years. McFarland, 2011.

External links

1889 births
1951 deaths
American male film actors
20th-century American male actors